"Amico è" is a 1983 song composed by Dario Baldan Bembo (music), Nini Giacomelli and  Sergio Bardotti (lyrics), and performed by Baldan Bembo and Caterina Caselli.

A hymn to friendship, "Amico è" was the ending theme song of the Mike Bongiorno's quiz show SuperFlash. The song was also linked to a contest organized by the magazine TV Sorrisi e Canzoni, in which the readers should have identified four popular singers hidden among the choirs; in the last episode of the television show it was revealed they were Pupo, Ornella Vanoni, Giuni Russo and Gigliola Cinquetti.

Outside its immediate success, later the song became a widely spread football chant.

In the 1982 album Spirito della Terra, Baldan Bembo included a different version of the song titled "Falò" and featuring Riccardo Fogli and Marcella Bella. The song was also covered by numerous artists, including Kikki Danielsson and Kjell Roos in a Swedish version titled "Vem går med dig hem" and Celine Dion in a French version titled "Hymne à l'amitié".

Track listing

 7" single – ZCVE 50420 
 "Amico è"  (Dario Baldan Bembo, Sergio Bardotti, Nini Giacomelli)
 "Cammina cammina" (Dario Baldan Bembo, Sergio Bardotti, Nini Giacomelli)

Charts

References

1983 singles
1983 songs
Dario Baldan Bembo songs
Caterina Caselli songs
Songs written by Sergio Bardotti
Songs written by Dario Baldan Bembo